The Menorca Sun is Menorca's only English language newspaper. Issued every Friday, it has a circulation of 5,000.

References

External links
Menorca Sun official website

English-language newspapers published in Europe
Mass media in Menorca
Weekly newspapers published in Spain
Publications with year of establishment missing